Cleistesiopsis is an orchid genus in the tribe Pogonieae. Its members were included in Cleistes until 2009. Cleistesiopsis is native to the eastern and southeastern United States from New Jersey south to Florida, and west to Kentucky and Louisiana. The common names are rosebud orchid and small spreading pogonia.

Cleistesiopsis is a terrestrial orchid with an underground network of spreading fibrous roots. It is found in small clusters of single flowering stems, each with a single leaf blade about halfway up the 30 – 45 cm stem. A smaller floral bract clasps around the base of the flower and appears as a second smaller leaf blade.  The flower has three brown-green sepals spreading upward from the stem. Two upper petals and a lip below form the flower tube.

Cleistesiopsis flowers in the spring (April to May) along coastal plain area and around July in the mountains.  It prefers savannas, meadows, openings woodlands, where the soil is acidic and moist and  made up of rotting pine or other organic material, such as a boggy pine woodland. In the mountains that habitat may be xeric.

The plants are commonly up to 30 to 45 centimeters in height.  The flowers are 2–3 cm across, depending on species.

Species
Three species are recognized as of March 2023:

References

External links 
 
 

Pogonieae
Vanilloideae genera
Endemic orchids of the United States
Endemic flora of the United States